Beau Vallon may refer to:

Beau Vallon, Mauritius, a village
Beau Vallon, Seychelles, a bay and district